Bobrowski (feminine: Bobrowska; plural: Bobrowscy) is a Polish-language surname. Variants of the name are also common in Belarus, Ukraine and Russia. It is derived from the noun bobrъ ("beaver" in Slavic languages).

Related surnames

People

Bobrowski/Bobrowska 
 Czesław Bobrowski (1904–1996), Polish economist
 Johannes Bobrowski (1917–1965), German poet
 Stefan Bobrowski (1840–1863), Polish politician
 Szymon Bobrowski (born 1972), Polish actor
 Tadeusz Bobrowski (1829–1894), Polish social activist

Bobrovsky/Bobrovskaya 
Cecilia Bobrovskaya (1873–1960), Russian revolutionary and memoirist
Elena Bobrovskaya (born 1975), Kyrgyz athlete 
Sergei Bobrovsky (born 1988), Russian ice-hockey player
Vladimir Bobrovsky (1873–1924), Russian Bolshevik revolutionary

See also
 
 

Polish-language surnames